Darío Villalba Flórez (February 22, 1939 – June 16, 2018) was a Spanish painter, photographer, and competitive figure skater. He represented Spain at the 1956 Winter Olympics where he placed 14th.

Life and career
Darío Villalba Flórez was born on February 22, 1939, in San Sebastián. He began skating at age 11 in Philadelphia, where his father was serving as the Spanish consul. He returned to Spain when he was 14 years old. As the only rink in Spain was small and of poor quality, his parents sent him to Chamonix, France, where he was taught by a German coach, Thea Frenssen.

At the age of 16, he represented Spain at the 1956 Winter Olympics in Cortina d'Ampezzo, Italy. He placed 14th of 16 competitors in the men's singles event. He then finished 15th at the 1956 World Championships in Garmisch-Partenkirchen, Germany.

In 1983 he received Spain's National Award for Plastic Arts.

In 2002, Villalba became a member of the Real Academia de Bellas Artes de San Fernando.

Competitive highlights

Bibliography
 Luis Gonzales-Robles, Darío Villalba, Galleria del Naviglio, Milan, 1970
 Giancarlo Politi, Darío Villalba, Galeria Vandres, Madrid, 1974

References

1939 births
2018 deaths
Sportspeople from San Sebastián
Basque artists
Spanish painters
Spanish contemporary artists
Spanish male single skaters
Olympic figure skaters of Spain
Figure skaters at the 1956 Winter Olympics